Iminodiacetic acid is the organic compound with the formula HN(CH2CO2H)2, often abbreviated to IDA. A white solid, the compound is a dicarboxylic acid amine (the nitrogen atom forms a secondary amino group, not an imino group as the name suggests). The iminodiacetate dianion is a tridentate ligand, forming metal complexes by forming two, fused, five membered chelate rings. The proton on the nitrogen atom can be replaced by a carbon atom of a polymer to create an ion-exchange resin, such as chelex 100. Complexes of IDA and EDTA were introduced in the early 1950's by Schwarzenbach.

IDA forms stronger complexes than the bidentate ligand glycine and weaker complexes than the tetradentate ligand nitrilotriacetic acid.  It can also act as a bidentate ligand through its two carboxylate groups.  Several technetium-99m complexes are used in cholescintigraphy scans (also known as hepatobiliary iminodiacetic acid scans) to evaluate the health and function of the gallbladder.

Iminodiacetic acid is an important intermediate in one of the two main industrial processes used to manufacture the herbicide glyphosate.  It is used in capillary electrophoresis for modulating peptide mobility. It is also used as a precursor for the manufacture of the indicator xylenol orange.

See also
 HIDA scan

References

Dicarboxylic acids
Chelating agents
Amines